The Azores dogfish (Scymnodalatias garricki) is a very rare sleeper shark of the family Somniosidae. It is known only from the holotype caught north of the Azores and another caught in 2001.

The Azores dogfish lives in the northeastern Atlantic Ocean at depths of 300-2000m. Like most sharks, it is ovoviviparous.

References

 

Azores dogfish
Endemic fauna of the Azores
Azores dogfish